These are the official results of the Men's marathon event at the 1994 European Championships in Helsinki, Finland. The race was held on 14 August 1994.

Medalists

Abbreviations
All times shown are in hours:minutes:seconds

Intermediates

Final ranking

Team results

Participation
According to an unofficial count, 79 athletes from 22 countries participated in the event.

 (1)
 (2)
 (3)
 (6)
 (6)
 (6)
 (1)
 (6)
 (1)
 (6)
 (1)
 (5)
 (3)
 (4)
 (5)
 (6)
 (1)
 (6)
 (6)
 (2)
 (1)
 (1)

See also
 1992 Men's Olympic Marathon (Barcelona)
 1994 European Marathon Cup

References

External links
 Results
 marathonspiegel

Marathon
Marathons at the European Athletics Championships
1994 marathons
Men's marathons
Marathons in Finland